David Stuart Davies (born 1946) is a British writer. He worked as a teacher of English before becoming a full-time editor, writer, and playwright. Davies has written extensively about Sherlock Holmes, both fiction and non-fiction. He is the editor of Red Herrings, the monthly in-house publication of the Crime Writers' Association.

Novels

Sherlock Holmes Adventures
Sherlock Holmes and the Hentzau Affair (1991)
The Tangled Skein (1992): Holmes battles Count Dracula in a re-imagining of the events of the Bram Stoker novel.
The Scroll of the Dead (1998): Holmes and Dr. Watson pursue an ancient Egyptian treasure with links to immortality.
Shadow of the Rat (1999)
The Veiled Detective (2004): An alternate account of the relationship between Holmes and Watson that posits Watson as an agent of Professor Moriarty.
The Games Afoot (2008)
The Devil's Promise (2014)
The Ripper Legacy (2016)
The Instrument of Death (2019)
Revenge from the Grave (2022)

Johnny One Eye
Johnny Hawke is removed from the army after a rifle explodes in his face and he loses an eye. Offered a desk job with the police, Johnny sets up as a private investigator in London. When asked to investigate the disappearance of a young woman things turn dangerous. Could there be a connection between the girl and fading film actor Gordon Moore?

Forests of the Night (2000)
Comes the Dark (2006)
Without Conscience (2008)
Requiem for a Dummy (2009)
The Darkness of Death (2010)
A Taste for Blood (2013)

Detective Inspector Paul Snow
Brothers in Blood (2013)
Innocent Blood (2015)
Blood Rites (2017)

Non-fiction
His non-fiction books about Sherlock Holmes include:
Holmes of the Movies: The Screen Career of Sherlock Holmes (1977)
Bending the Willow: Jeremy Brett as Sherlock Holmes (1996; revised 2002)
Starring Sherlock Holmes: A Century of the Master Detective on Screen (2001, updated 2007)
Clued Up on Sherlock (2004)
Dancing in the Moonlight: Jeremy Brett - A Celebration (2006)

Plays
His award-winning one-man play Sherlock Holmes - The Last Act is still touring after its premiere at Salisbury Playhouse in 1999. It has played in France, Canada, United States, Hong Kong, Malta and all over the British Isles.

In 2009, Big Finish Productions released audio adaptations of his plays The Last Act and The Death and Life, starring Roger Llewellyn. They also adapted The Tangled Skein into a two part audio drama starring Nicholas Briggs.

Other work
Davies is the editor of several collections for Wordsworth & Collectors Library (Barnes & Noble) including:
The Best of Sherlock Holmes
Shadows of Sherlock Holmes
Stories from the Nineteenth Century
Tales of Unease
Return From the Dead
In 2009 an omnibus volume of William Fryer Harvey's stories, titled "The Beast with Five Fingers". The volume contains 45 stories, and an extensive biographical introduction.

His DVD work includes writing and narrating commentaries for the MPI release of the digitally re-mastered Basil Rathbone Holmes films; conducting interviews on the new Jeremy Brett Holmes releases; and with David Jason on A Touch of Frost DVDs.

Davies is one-third of the literary performance group The Mystery Men, alongside Matthew Booth and M. J. Elliott.

References

External links
 Author Profile at Piccadilly Publishing on the digital release of his own Sherlock Holmes series (Davis is not listed, May 2019.)
 

Sherlock Holmes scholars
1946 births
Living people
British dramatists and playwrights
British crime fiction writers
British book editors
British male novelists
British male dramatists and playwrights